Achille Simonetti (12 June 1857 – 19 November 1928) was a prominent Italian violinist and composer, mainly resident in England and Ireland. He was mainly known as a chamber musician and teacher.

Life
Born in Turin on 12 June 1857, Simonetti left his family in Bologna (this can be gleaned from his letter to Mr Hill (of Hills and Sons) written in 1922,) and completed his studies under Francesco Bianchi, Eugenio Cavallini, Giuseppe Gamba, Charles Dancla (regarded as the last exponent of the classical French school of violin playing), and Camillo Sivori, the last pupil of Niccolo Paganini.

Simonetti died aged 71 in London on 19 November 1928.

Career
Simonetti came to England in 1891, embarking on a career as chamber musician. He became part of the first London Trio, an endeavour which occupied him from 1901 to 1912, along with cellist William Whitehouse and pianist Amina Goodwin.

From 1912 to 1919, he was a professor of violin at the Royal Irish Academy of Music, and served as a teacher for many distinguished violinists, including Walter Starkie.

Simonetti was also an early champion of the Brahms Violin Concerto, and wrote a cadenza for the work.

Selected compositions
Orchestral
 Ronde joyeuse for string orchestra
 Sérénade for string orchestra
 Meditazione for small orchestra 

Chamber music
 Allegretto Romantico in D minor for viola and piano (published 1897)
 Andante mélancolique for violin (or cello) and piano
 Ballata in C minor for viola and piano (published 1897)
 Berceuse for violin and piano
 Canzonetta for violin and piano
 Capriccio for violin and piano
 Cavatina for cello and piano
 Elegia for cello and piano
 Furlana, Italian Dance for violin and piano
 Madrigale in D major for violin and piano (1901) - wrote text and music? - (Different?) music has been set to this by Pietro Floridia.
 Mazurka for violin and piano
 Minuetto for violin and piano
 Notturnino for violin and piano
 Rêverie for violin and piano
 Romanza for violin and piano
 Romanzetta for violin and piano
 Sonata No. 2, Op. 9, for violin and piano in C major (published 1894)
 Scènes montagnardes, Op. 12, for violin and piano
 String Quartet No. 1 in D minor, Op. 14 (published 1904)
 String Quartet No. 2 in B flat major, Op. 16 (published c.1904)

Piano
 Caprice-Mazurka for piano
 Trois Morceaux caractéristiques (3 Character Pieces) for piano

References

External links
 

1857 births
1928 deaths
19th-century Italian musicians
19th-century Italian male musicians
Italian classical composers
Italian classical violinists
Italian emigrants to the United Kingdom
Italian male classical composers
Male classical violinists
Musicians from Turin